Muhammed Hasan Faqi (1912–2004) was a Saudi poet and writer born in Makkah. He was educated in Makkah and Jeddah, worked as a teacher in Alfalah school and then as editor-in-chief of the Saut Al-Hijaz newspaper. Faqi occupied various prominent positions in the Saudi government as he was appointed as an ambassador of Saudi Arabia to Indonesia.

Poetry 
Faqi published several collections of poetry short stories. Moreover, he published several books on various topics including literature, religion, and legal issues. His best poetry was published in  Rubaiyyat (QUARTETS), a collection 474 quatrains.

QUARTETS 1.

I traveled life in search of tranquility 

But the journey amplified my sorrow and qualms. 

From so much suffering I feel as if 

I’ve inhabited this space for centuries 

What is it I want? I do not know my pursuit 

Is it glory that I seek? Is it pleasure? 

Yet hardship has its contentment 

I have grown, 

for all of life’s jolts 

More tender still.

References 

1912 births
2004 deaths
20th-century Saudi Arabian poets